Stenalia iranica is a beetle in the genus Stenalia of the family Mordellidae. It was described in 1981 by Horák.

References

iranica
Beetles described in 1981